Out of the Blue is a 2022 American thriller film written and directed by Neil LaBute and starring Diane Kruger and Ray Nicholson.

Plot

Connor is a young man living in a small coastal New England town trying to rebuild his life following a stint in prison when he meets Marilyn, an alluring older woman whom he finds himself attracted to in which the two of them are soon involved in a romantic affair. Connor soon learns that Marilyn is actually married to an older man with whom she claims she is unhappy with. At one point, Marilyn suggests to Connor to murder her husband so they can be together. Connor wants no part in any murder-for-hire scheme until he is suspected in a number of break-in robberies in town which his parole officer, Jock, wrongfully suspects him of committing, but cannot prove it. Suspecting that Marilyn might be setting him up as a fall guy, but too blinded by his infatuation with her, he agrees to the murder plot.

Cast
Diane Kruger as Marilyn
Ray Nicholson as Connor
Hank Azaria as Jock
Chase Sui Wonders as Astrid
Gia Crovatin as Kim

Production
In August 2021, it was announced that Kruger and Nicholson were set to star in the film.  In September 2021, it was announced that Azaria was cast in the film.  In October 2021, it was announced that Chase Sui Wonders joined the cast of the film.

Filming occurred in Newport, Rhode Island in September 2021.

Reception
The film has a 15% approval rating on the review aggregator website Rotten Tomatoes, based on 20 reviews.

Robert Abele of TheWrap gave the film a negative review and wrote, "If an adulterous mystery in the Cain vein isn’t going to dazzle with its dialogue or titillate with its temptations, why is it there?"

Jeannette Catsoulis of The New York Times also gave the film a negative review and wrote, "A last-minute twist comes too late to rescue the plot; Connor, sadly, was always beyond saving."

References

External links
 

American thriller films
Films directed by Neil LaBute
Films shot in Rhode Island
Quiver Distribution films
2020s American films